Francisco João Rodrigues Baptista Monteiro Pereira (born 6 February 2002), known as just Fran Pereira, is a Portuguese professional footballer who plays as a midfielder for Estoril Praia.

Career
Fran is a product of the youth academies of Panther Force, Torrão, Salgueiros, Arcozelo and Boavista. On 22 January 2020, he signed his first professional contract with Boavista. He made his professional debut with Boavista in a 1–0 Taça da Liga win over Marítimo on 25 July 2021.

References

External links
 
 
 FPF Profile

2002 births
Living people
Sportspeople from Vila Nova de Gaia
Portuguese footballers
Association football midfielders
Primeira Liga players
Boavista F.C. players
G.D. Estoril Praia players